Established in 1909, the Robert R. McCormick School of Engineering and Applied Science is one of twelve constituent schools at Northwestern University. Most engineering classes are held in the Technological Institute (1942), which students commonly refer to as "Tech." In October 2005, another building affiliated with the School, the Ford Motor Company Engineering Design Center, opened.

History 
The trustees of Northwestern University founded a College of Technology in June 1873, but in his report for 1876-77, President Oliver Marcy announced that the new college had failed for lack of financial resources to develop the faculty and facilities.

In 1891, President Henry Wade Rogers called for the founding of a new Engineering School, stating that universities in general were “not performing the work necessary to prepare men for the various activities of modern life, so different from the life their fathers lived half a century ago.”  This was realized in 1909, when the new College of Engineering was opened in Swift Hall.
Operationally, the Engineering School until the mid-1920s was a department of the College of Liberal Arts.  The major emphasis was on a broad general education with a particular stress on mathematics and science.  In 1937, the Engineering School ran into difficulties with the American Engineers' Council for Professional Development, which denied the School accreditation.  In response, a four-year curriculum satisfying the ECPD was put into place.

In 1939, Walter Patton Murphy (1873–1942), a wealthy inventor of railroad equipment, donated $6.735 million to the School of Engineering. Murphy meant for the Institute to offer a  “cooperative” education, whereby academic courses and practical application in industrial settings were closely integrated. In 1942, Northwestern received an additional bequest of $28 million from Murphy's estate to provide for an engineering school "second to none."
A cooperative education program was designed in the late 1930s by Charles F. Kettering, former research head of General Motors, and Herman Schneider, dean of the engineering school at the University of Cincinnati. The program required undergraduates to work outside the classroom in technical positions for several terms over the course of their college years. 

In 1987, Julia R. Weertman was appointed chair of the department of materials science and engineering, making her the first woman to hold a chair position in an engineering school within the United States.

Campus

Most engineering classes are held in the Northwestern Technological Institute building, which students refer to as "Tech."
Ground was broken for the new building on April 1, 1940 and the building was dedicated on June 15–16, 1942.  The building was designed in the shape of two letter E's, placed back to back and joined by a central structure. Each of the six original departments used one of the wings. When it was built it was the largest building on Northwestern's Evanston campus.

Curriculum 
 a faculty of 180 taught 1450 undergraduates.

In 1996, Northwestern University launched an engineering program called Engineering Design and Communication (EDC), which is a mandatory class for all undergraduate engineering students. EDC consists of two quarter-long classes that focus on design and communication within the Engineering discipline. Each EDC class has 16 students who are team-taught by one professor from the McCormick School of Engineering and Applied Science and one professor from the Writing Program of the Weinberg College of Arts and Sciences. EDC classes typically work with the Rehabilitation Institute of Chicago or other local non-profit organizations. The EDC program was renamed Design Thinking and Communication, or DTC, beginning with the 2012-2013 school year. 

The Engineering Analysis program is also mandatory for all undergraduate engineering students and consists of four quarter-long classes. These classes provide the basis for Northwestern's engineering curriculum, and teach linear algebra, statics and dynamics, system dynamics, and differential equations. In addition, students become familiar with the computer programming language MATLAB.

The graduate curriculum includes MMM program from the Segal Design Institute, a joint degree program including an MBA from the Kellogg School of Management and an MS in Design Innovation (MSDI) from McCormick. Historically, McCormick offered MEM for MMM graduates with few courses opted from different schools of the Northwestern University. Other Segal degrees include the Master of Product Design and Development Management (mpd2) and MS in Engineering Design Innovation (EDI).

Co-op Program
The Walter P. Murphy Cooperative Engineering Education Program at Northwestern. Students work at a paid internship with one company for 3-6 academic quarters spread out throughout the students' undergraduate careers, including at least one period of two consecutive quarters. While participating in the co-op program, students maintain full-time student status.

See also 
Biomedical Engineering
Center for Quantum Devices
Chemical and Biological Engineering
Civil and Environmental Engineering
Electrical Engineering and Computer Science
Engineering Sciences and Applied Mathematics
Industrial Engineering and Management Sciences
Materials Science and Engineering
Mechanical Engineering
Segal Design Institute

References

External links
McCormick School

Engineering schools and colleges in the United States
Engineering universities and colleges in Illinois
Northwestern University
Educational institutions established in 1909
1909 establishments in Illinois
McCormick family